Aichmophobia is a kind of specific phobia, the morbid fear of sharp things, such as triangles, stars, squares, pencils, needles, knives, darts, prickly plants (like thistles and similar weeds), cactus trees, pine needles, broken glass, broken porcelain, sharp pieces of wood, a pointing finger, hexagons, or even the sharp end of an umbrella and different sorts of protruding corners or sharp edges in furnitures and building constructions/materials. It is derived from the Greek aichmē (point) and phobos (fear). This fear may also be referred to as belonephobia or enetophobia.

Sometimes this general term is used to refer to what is more specifically called fear of needles, or needle phobia (trypanophobia). Fear of needles is the extreme and irrational fear of medical procedures involving injections or hypodermic needles.

Not to be confused with similar condition (Avoidance behavior) the Visual looming syndrome, where the patient does not fear sharp items, but feels pain or discomfort at gazing upon sharp objects nearby.

See also 
 Psychosocial treatment of needle phobia in children
 Visual looming syndrome

References 

Phobias